This list covers television programs whose first letter (excluding "the") of the title is T.

T

TA
The Tab Hunter Show
Table for 3
Table for 12
Taboo (UK)
Taboo (US)
Tagesschau (Germany)
Taggart (Scotland)
Taina
Tak and the Power of Juju
Take Two
Taken (miniseries)
Taken (NBC)
Take On the Twisters (UK)
Takeshi's Castle (Japan)
Take the High Road
Take This House and Sell It
Take Two with Phineas and Ferb
Takin' Over the Asylum
Talent Varieties
Tales from the Crypt
Tales from the Cryptkeeper
Tales from the Darkside
Tales From Fat Tulip's Garden
Tales of Little Women (Japan)
Tales of Tomorrow
Tales of the Unexpected
Tales of Wells Fargo
TaleSpin
Talia in the Kitchen
The Talk
Talk Soup
Talkback Live
Talking Bad
Talking Dead
Tallship Chronicles
Tamagotchi!
Tamra's OC Wedding
Tamron Hall
Tangled: The Series
Tanisha Gets Married
Tanked
Tarzan and the Super 7
The Tarzan/Lone Ranger Adventure Hour
Tarzan, Lord of the Jungle
Tate
Tattletales
Taxi

TE
Teachers (UK)
Teachers (US) (2006)
Teachers (US) (2016)
Teacher's Pet
Team Galaxy
Team Ninja Warrior
Team Umizoomi
Team Zenko Go
Teamo Supremo
The Ted Knight Show (1978)
The Ted Knight Show (1986)
Ted Lasso
Teenage Mutant Ninja Turtles (1987)
Teenage Mutant Ninja Turtles (2003)
Teenage Mutant Ninja Turtles (2012)
Teen Mom
Teen Mom 2
Teen Mom 3
Teen Mom UK
Teen Titans
Teen Titans Go!
Teen Wolf (1986)
Teen Wolf (2011) 
The Telebugs 
Ten 7 Aotearoa (formerly Police Ten 7, 2002–2023)
Tenko and the Guardians of the Magic 
Telenovela
Teletubbies
Tell Me You Love Me
Temperatures Rising
Temptation Island
Tenable
Ten Days in the Valley
Ten Dollar Dinners
Tennessee Tuxedo
Teresa Checks In
The Terminal List
Terminator: The Sarah Connor Chronicles
Terra Nova
Terry and June
Texaco Star Theater
Texas
Texas Country Reporter
Texas Justice
The Texas Wheelers
Texas Women

TH
Thank Your Lucky Stars
That '70s Show
That '80s Show
That Damn Michael Che
That Girl
That Girl Lay Lay
That's Incredible!
That's Life (1968)
That's Life (1998)
That's Life (2000)
That's My Boy (US)
That's My Boy (UK)
That's My Bush!
That's My Dog
That's My Mama
That's So Raven
That's So Werid! (Canada)
That Was The Week That Was
Then Came Bronson
Then and Now with Andy Cohen
There Goes the Motherhood
The Leftovers
The Voice  
They Came from Outer Space
The Thick of It (UK)
Thicker than Water (1973)
Thicker Than Water (2013)
Thierry La Fronde
Think Fast (ABC)
Think Fast (Nickelodeon)
Third Watch
Thirtysomething
This American Life
This Old House
This Hour Has 22 Minutes
This Is Life with Lisa Ling
This Is Us
This Is Your Day
This Is Your Life
This Week
Thomas and Friends
Three Busy Debras
Three Chords from the Truth (Canada)
Three Delivery
Three Rivers
Three's a Crowd (sitcom)
Three's a Crowd (game show)
Three's Company
The Three Friends and Jerry
Three Up, Two Down
Threshold
Thriller (UK)
Thriller (US)
Thronecast (UK)
Throwdown! with Bobby Flay
Thundarr The Barbarian
Thunderbirds
Thunderbirds 2086 (Japan)
 ThunderCats (1985)
 ThunderCats (2011)
 ThunderCats Roar
The Thundermans
Thursday Night Football

TI
Tia & Tamera
The Tick
Tickety Toc
Tic-Tac-Dough
Tikkabilla
'Til Death
Till Death Us Do Part
Tim and Eric Nite Live!
Tim and Eric Awesome Show, Great Job!
The Tim Conway Comedy Hour
Timber Creek Lodge
Time After Time
Timeblazers
Timecop
Timeless
Time of Your Life
Time Signs
Timeslip
Time Squad
Time Team
Time Trax
The Time Tunnel
Time Warp Trio
Time Was
Timmy Time (UK)
Timothy Goes To School
Tiny Toon Adventures
Tipping Point
Tiswas
The Titan Games

 Titan Maximum
 Titans

Tittybangbang
Titus

TJ
T. J. Hooker

TK
TKO: Total Knock Out

TM 

 TMZ

TN
TNA British Boot Camp (UK)
TNA Reaction
TNA Today

TO
To Be Hero (Japan, 2016)
Today on the Farm
Today (Ireland)
Today (US)
Today's Special
Toddlers & Tiaras
ToddWorld
The Tofus
Tokusou Sentai Dekaranger
Tokyo Tarareba Musume (Japan, 2017)
Tom and Jerry
The Tom and Jerry Show (1975)
The Tom and Jerry Show (2014)
Tom and Jerry Tales
Tom Corbett, Space Cadet
Tom, Dick and Mary
The Tom Ewell Show
Tom Goes to the Mayor
Toma
The Tomorrow People (UK)
The Tomorrow People (US)
The Tomorrow Show
Tomorrow's World (UK)
The Tonight Show
Tonight Starring Jack Paar
Tonight Starring Steve Allen
The Tonight Show Starring Jimmy Fallon
The Tonight Show Starring Johnny Carson
The Tonight Show with Conan O'Brien
The Tonight Show with Jay Leno
Tony Bennett at the Talk of the Town (UK, 1972)
The Tony Danza Show (1997)
The Tony Danza Show (2004)
Too Close to Home
Too Hot to Handle
Tool Academy
Toon In with Me
Tooned In
ToonMarty
 Toonsylvania
Top 20 Countdown
Top Cat
Top Chef
Top Chef Duels
Top Chef Junior
Top Chef Masters
Top Cops
Top Design
Top Gear (1977)
Top Gear (2002)
Top Model (Poland)
Top of the Pops (UK)
Top Wing (Canada)
Topper
Toopy and Binoo
Torchwood
Torchy the Battery Boy (UK)
Tori & Dean: Cabin Fever
Tori & Dean: Home Sweet Hollywood
Tori & Dean: sTORIbook Weddings
To Rome With Love
The Tortellis
Tosh.0
Total Bellas
Total Divas
Total Drama (Canada)
Total Drama Action
Total Drama Island
Total DramaRama (Canada)
Total Drama: Revenge of the Island
Total Drama World Tour
Totally Spies
Total Request Live
Total Wipeout
To Tell the Truth
To the Manor Born (BBC Sitcom)
T.O.T.S.
Tots TV
Touch
Touched by an Angel
Touching Evil
Tough Crowd with Colin Quinn
Tour of Duty
Tour Group
Tower Prep
The Toy Box
The Toy Castle
Toy Story Toons
The Toys That Made Us

TR
Tracey McBean
The Tracey Ullman Show
Tracey Ullman's Show (UK)
Trading Spaces
Trading Spaces: Boys vs. Girls
Trading Spouses
The Traffickers (UK)
Trailer Park Boys
Training Day
Transformers
Transformers: Animated
Transformers: Armada
Transformers - Beast Machines
Transformers: Beast Wars
Transformers: Cybertron
Transformers: EarthSpark
Transformers: Energon
Transformers: Prime
Transformers: Robots in Disguise
Tranzor Z
Trapper John, M.D.
Trauma
Trauma: Life in the E.R.
The Travel Show (UK)
Treasure Hunt
Tree Fu Tom (UK)
Treme
Trial and Error (1988)
Trial & Error (2017)
Tribes and Empires: Storm of Prophecy (China)
Trick My Truck
Trick My Trucker
Trigun
Trinity Blood
Triple Nine
Tripping the Rift (Canada)
Trivia Track
Trivia Trap
Trivial Pursuit (UK)
Trivial Pursuit (US)
Trivial Pursuit: America Plays
Trollhunters
Trolls: The Beat Goes On!
Trollz
The Troop
Trophy Wife
Tron: Uprising
Trot Lovers (South Korea)
The Troubleshooters
Tru Calling
True and the Rainbow Kingdom
True Blood
True Detective
True Jackson: VP
True Life
True Tori
Trumpton (BBC)
Truth or Consequences
Truth & Iliza
TruTV Presents: World's Dumbest...

TU
Tucker Carlson Tonight
Tuckerville
The Tudors
Tuesday Night Titans
T.U.F.F. Puppy
Turbo Fast
Turkey Television
Turnabout
Turn A Gundam
Tupu
Turn-On

TW
Tweenies (UK)
The Twentieth Century (1957–1970)
Twenty-One
Twenty Questions
Twice in a Lifetime
The Twilight Zone (1959)
The Twilight Zone (1985)
The Twilight Zone (2002)
The Twins of Destiny
The Twisted Tales of Felix the Cat
The Twisted Whiskers Show
Twin Peaks
Two and a Half Men
Two for the Money
Two Guys and a Girl
Two of a Kind (UK)
Two of a Kind (US)
Two Pints of Lager and a Packet of Crisps (UK)
The Two Ronnies (UK)

TV
TV Funhouse
TV's Bloopers & Practical Jokes

TY
Tyler Perry's For Better or Worse
Tyler Perry's House of Payne
Tyler Perry's Ruthless
Tyler Perry's The Oval
Tyler Perry's Young Dylan
The Tyra Banks Show
Tyrant
Previous:  List of television programs: T    Next:  List of television programs: U-V-W